Milecastle 20 (Halton Shields) was one of the milecastles on Hadrian's Wall. It is situated in the hamlet of Halton Shields, and was excavated in 1935. There is no visible trace of the milecastle above ground.

Description
Milecastle 20 is situated at the east end of the hamlet of Halton Shields. Its remains are located in the garden of a cottage, with the south wall and gate being covered by a house to the immediate west.

An antiquarian depiction of the Military Road at the entrance to Halton Shields Farm dated 1879, shows several large blocks which appear to have been the pivot stones from the milecastle gateway, together with threshold blocks.

Excavations
Milecastle 20 was excavated in 1935. It was about 17.7 metres by 16.3 metres, with a Type III gateway.

Associated turrets 
Each milecastle on Hadrian's Wall had two associated turret structures. These turrets were positioned approximately one-third and two-thirds of a Roman mile to the west of the Milecastle, and would probably have been manned by part of the nearest milecastle's garrison. The turrets associated with Milecastle 20 are known as Turret 20A and Turret 20B.

Turret 20A
Turret 20A (Carr Hill) is covered by the modern road, and the precise location is uncertain.  It was apparently located in 1935 by pottery finds only.

Turret 20B
Turret 20B (Downhill East) is likewise covered by a modern road, and the precise location is uncertain.

Roman temporary camps
The partial remains of two possible Roman temporary camps lie about 350 metres to the south of Milecastle 20. The camps are visible as earthworks on aerial photographs. The north-western half of the enclosure is visible as a low bank with two rounded corners. A second, less clear potential camp, is to the north-east of the first camp.

Monument records

References

External links 

20